Hong Kong Basic Law Article 45 is an article in the Basic Law of Hong Kong. It states that the Chief executive should be chosen by universal suffrage upon nomination by a broadly representative nominating committee as an eventual goal.

Content of Article 45
Article 45 gives the requirements for choosing the Chief Executive:

Details of procedures to be adopted are found in Annex I to the Basic Law where the same expression "broadly representative" is used to describe the constituency of the Election Committee notwithstanding its only representing a tiny section of the total number of registered electors.

Background
Paragraph 3 of Annex I Section I of the Sino-British Joint Declaration provides the corresponding backing for art.45:

The earlier version of Article 45, from December 1987 (Article 45 in 1987), contained the details of the methods for selecting the Chief Executive, which was put in the Annex I to the April 1988 version and then in the enacted version. The Hong Kong Basic Law Consultative Committee noted that opinions were expressed on several areas of the article, including whether the Chief Executive should be appointed by the Central People's Government; that consultation is not as democratic as direct or indirect elections; and that the clause “in accordance with the principle of gradual and orderly progress” is vague and difficult to define legally.

Controversy

The focus of initial controversy was on the timetable for progress towards universal suffrage but, having extracted a promise of a timetable of reform (2016 for the legislature and 2017 for the Chief Executive) heated debate ensued over the details of the election systems to be employed.  Positions on both sides hardened in early 2013, with the newly appointed chairman of the PRC government's Law Committee, Qiao Xiaoyang, espousing hard-to-define pre-conditions on CE candidature, ("love China and Hong Kong" and "not oppose the Central Government") including declaring that Beijing would refuse to appoint an unsupportive Hong Kong CE even if democratically elected. Pro-democracy groups formed the Alliance for True Democracy in support of the Occupy Central with Love and Peace protest movement, devised by University of Hong Kong Associate Professor Benny Tai, demanding unconditional universal suffrage.

References

See also
Article 45 Concern Group
Democratic development in Hong Kong
2005 Hong Kong Chief Executive election
Politics of Hong Kong

Politics of Hong Kong
Hong Kong Basic Law